The name Skyler or Skylar is an Anglicized spelling of the surname and given name Schuyler.

Schuyler was introduced into America as a surname by 17th century Dutch settlers arriving in New York. By the 19th century, in honor of members of New York's prominent Schuyler family such as Philip Schuyler, the surname had entered use as a given name; for example, Schuyler Colfax (1823–1885), the 17th Vice President of the United States.

The spellings Skyler and Skylar first in the United States during the 1980s. The name is in use for both boys and girls.

Masculine given name
 Skyler Stone (born 1979), American actor and comedian
 Skyler Green (born 1984), American football player for the Dallas Cowboys
 Skylar Astin (born 1987), American actor
 Skyler Gisondo (born 1996), American actor
 Skyler Page (born 1989), American animator and voice actor
 Skyler Milne (born 1993), American soccer player
 Skyler Howard  (born 1994), American football quarterback
 Skyler Bowlin (born 1989), American professional basketball player
 Skyler Stromsmoe (born 1984), Canadian professional baseball utility player 
 Skyler Wheeler (born 1993), Republican member 
 Skylar Kergil (born 1991), American transgender activist 
 Skylar Thomas (soccer) (born 1993), Canadian professional soccer player

Pseudonyms
 Skylar Spence, stage name of Ryan DeRobertis, musician and singer

Fictional characters 
 Skyler Morse, a fictional character from the animated TV series South Park

Feminine given name
 Skyler White (writer) (b. 1967), American writer of fantasy, science fiction, and romance novels
 Skyler Day (b. 1991), American actress and singer
 Skylar Diggins-Smith (b. 1990), American professional basketball player
 Skylar Brandt (b. 1993), American ballet dancer
 Skyler Samuels (b. 1994), American actress
 Skylar Laine (b. 1994), American singer
 Skylar Stecker (b. 2002), American singer-songwriter and actress

Pseudonyms
 Skylar Grey, stage name of Holly Brook Hafermann, multi-instrumentalist, singer, songwriter, and record producer

Fictional characters 
 Skylar Adams, a fictional character from the TV series Alphas
 Skylar Banes, a fictional character from Ubisoft's Anno 2070
 Skylar Bergman, fictional character from the TV series Baywatch
 Skyler Dayton, fictional character from the TV series Stacked
 Skylar Deacon, a fictional character from the 2000 novel Calling the Swan by Jean Thesman
 Skyler the Fireworks Fairy, fictional character from the book series Rainbow Magic
 Skylar Sinclair, a fictional character from EA's The Saboteur
 Skylar Stevens, the fictional character from the television series Jericho
 Skylar Storm, a fictional character from the TV series Mighty Med
 Skyler White, a fictional character from the TV series Breaking Bad
 Skylar, a fictional character from the movie Good Will Hunting

Surname 
 Edward Skyler (born 1973), former Deputy Mayor for Operations for New York City
 Tristine Skyler (born 1971), American playwright, screenwriter, and producer
 Sunny Skylar (1913–2009), American composer, singer, lyricist, and music publisher

See also 
 
 Schuyler (disambiguation)
 Sky (disambiguation)

References

Occupational surnames
English-language unisex given names
English-language feminine given names
English-language masculine given names
English unisex given names
English feminine given names
English masculine given names
Unisex given names
Feminine given names
Masculine given names